The 2008 Fresno mayoral election was held on June 3, 2008 and November 4, 2008 to elect the mayor of Fresno, California. It saw the election of Ashley Swearengin.

Incumbent mayor Alan Autry was term limited.

Results

First round

Runoff results

References 

Fresno mayor
2008
Fresno